His Majesty's Adjutant is a Czechoslovak comedy film directed by Martin Frič. It was released in 1933.

Cast
 Vlasta Burian - Adjutant Patera
 Gretl Theimer - Pepi Kalasch
 Werner Fuetterer - Prinz Eugen
 Anni Markart - Prinzessin Anna Luise
 Hans Götz - Oberleutnant Kinzel
 Emmy Carpentier - Bardame
 Josef Vaverka
 Else Lord - Chansonière
 Leo Dudek - Fiakerhälter (as Leopold Dudek)
 Otto Ströhlin - Mader

External links
 

1933 films
1933 comedy films
Czechoslovak black-and-white films
Films directed by Martin Frič
Czechoslovak multilingual films
Czechoslovak comedy films
1933 multilingual films
1930s Czech films